The 2010 Old Dominion Monarchs football team represented Old Dominion University during the 2010 NCAA Division I FCS football season. The team compiled an 8–3 record, in their second season under the guidance of head coach Bobby Wilder. The Monarchs competed as an independent. The team's home games were held at Foreman Field.

Schedule

References

Old Dominion
Old Dominion Monarchs football seasons
Old Dominion Monarchs football